His Neighbor's Wife is a 1913 silent short film directed by Edwin S. Porter and starring Victorian actress and celebrity Lillie Langtry in her only feature screen appearance. It was produced by Adolph Zukor's Famous Players Film Company and distributed on a State Rights basis.

Cast
Lillie Langtry - Mrs. Norton
Sidney Mason - Mr. Norton
Mimi Yvonne - The Norton Child
Leslie T. Peacocke - Captain Roberts

See also
List of Paramount Pictures films

References

External links
His Neighbor's Wife at IMDb.com
 His Neighbor's Wife, 1913(archived)
 Photo of Lillie Langtry in the movie(archived)

1913 films
American silent short films
Films directed by Edwin S. Porter
Famous Players-Lasky films
American black-and-white films
1910s American films